Angang No clan was one of the Korean clans. Their Bon-gwan was in Gyeongju, North Gyeongsang Province. According to the research in 2000, the number of Angang No clan was 280. He was 6th son of  who was dispatched to Silla when he was a Hanlin Academy in Tang dynasty.  was chosen as Prince of Angang during Goryeo period.

See also 
 Korean clan names of foreign origin

References

External links 
 

 
Korean clan names of Chinese origin